Bruce Claflin is an American businessman and Corporate Director having served in the past on the boards of 3Com Corporation, Time Warner Telecom, and Advanced Micro Devices (AMD) where he was Executive Chairman for 10 years. He is currently a director of Ciena Corp, a global supplier of telecommunications networking equipment, software, and services and IDEXX Laboratories a provider of Veterinary Diagnostic Systems and Software.

Education
Claflin received his bachelor of arts degree in political science from Pennsylvania State University.

Career

In 1973 Claflin joined IBM in a sales position.  Over a 22 year career he held a number of senior positions in Sales, Marketing, Research, Development and General Management both in the US and overseas.  In 1992 Claflin led the team which developed the IBM ThinkPad line of products after which he became President of Personal Computers/America.  Claflin left IBM in 1995 to become Senior Vice President and General Manager at Digital Equipment Corp responsible for their Personal Computer Business. In 1998 he was named Executive Vice President, Sales and Marketing, a position he held until the sale of the company to Compaq Corporation.  

In August 1998, he joined 3Com, a provider of networking equipment, software, services and attached devices, as President and Chief Operating Officer. In January of 2001 Claflin was appointed as a Director, President and Chief Executive Officer at 3Com a position he held until February, 2006, at which time he retired.

In addition to the board of 3Com, Mr. Claflin has also served on the board of directors of Time Warner Telecom and AMD, where he was Chairman for 14 years.  Mr Claflin currently serves on the boards of IDEXX Laboratories and Ciena Corporation.

References

External links
Ciena profile

American computer businesspeople
American technology chief executives
Living people
Year of birth missing (living people)
Place of birth missing (living people)